The Bandău (also: Unguraș) is a right tributary of the river Someșul Mic in Romania. It discharges into the Someșul Mic in Mica.

References

Rivers of Romania
Rivers of Cluj County